Samlidae is a taxonomic family of brightly coloured sea slugs, specifically nudibranchs, marine gastropod mollusks.

Genera and species
Genera within the family Samlidae include:
 Luisella Korshunova, Martynov, Bakken, Evertsen, Fletcher, Mudianta, Saito, Lundin, Schrödl & Picton, 2017
 Samla Bergh, 1900

References

 
Fionoidea